The Chalmette–Lower Algiers Ferry is a ferry across the Mississippi River in the U.S. state of Louisiana, connecting Chalmette and Algiers.

History
The ferry crossing has seen reduced use, especially among residents of Arabi at the western end of St. Bernard Parish, since the opening of the second span of the Crescent City Connection in 1988.

See also
List of crossings of the Lower Mississippi River

References

External links
Crescent City Connection Ferries
Louisiana Department of Transportation and Development, Locations and Characteristics of Ferries 

Ferries of the Mississippi River
Transportation in New Orleans
Ferries of Louisiana